Lee Min-woo, under the name "M", has been a solo singer since 2003, and a member of Korean boyband Shinhwa since 1998.  His solo material covers 4 studio albums, 3 EPs, one live album, and one single.

Albums

Studio albums

Live albums

Extended plays

Singles

Video albums

Music videos

Songwriting credits
Lee is composer, lyricist, and producer. He has written many songs for Shinhwa and for other Korean singers.

For Solo Album:
1st album : Punch, Sweet Girl
2nd album : Fighter, Bump, Let me love you, Sometimes, Battle (Jump, jump), LUV, Shingiru
3rd album : Showdown, The "M" Style, Boyfriend, Stomp, Pretty Woman, My Child (98/03/24)
4th album : I'm Here, I'M'U, Forgive Me, HOT, Wonderful Life, Wink Show, Seducing Honey, Sad Song
Mini album: Back to the Funk — M's Life
For Shinhwa's Album:
1st concert : My Everything
2nd concert : Make Money, Yo
3rd album : Soul
4th album : Reminiscence
5th album : Free
6th album : Lost in Love, Later, 79
7th album : All of My, Oh, U
8th album : Paradise
9th album : Run, SO IN LOVE, Destiny of Love
10th album : Venus, Red Carpet, Stay, Be my love
11th album : That's right, New me, Hurricane, I gave you

For other singers:
Jewelry : Superstar, One More Time
Lyn : Sunshine (feat. Eric)
SAT : Eraser (As a producer)
Kim Dong-wan : My Love (feat. Eric)
Wonder Girls : Move
Andy Lee: Never Give Up (feat. Eric, Dongwan, Minwoo)
V.O.S: Beautiful Life
 4Minute: "Femme Fatale" from Volume Up

Notes
 A  The Recording Industry Association Korea (RIAK) tracked physical album, EP, and singles sales and released a consolidated sales and ranking chart monthly from January 1999 to September 2008.  It did not track digital sales.
 B  The Gaon Music Chart began releasing data in 2010 after the Recording Industry Association Korea stopped compiling data in October 2008. Online sources for charts released after September 2008 and before January 2010 are currently unavailable.

References

Discographies of South Korean artists
Shinhwa